Laura Nezha (born September 16, 1990) is an Albanian singer, actress, and director.

Life and career
Laura Nezha was born in the city of Fier and then moved to the capital Tirana at a very young age. She started singing when she was only 5 years old in various children events. At 12 years old, she competed in the first season of the talent show "Gjeniu i vogël", where she earned the Third Prize among thousands of contestants from different Albanian-speaking territories. In 2007, she won the First Prize in the RinFest music competition.

Nezha rose to fame after participating in the major musical event Kënga Magjike in 2011, with the song "Jo s'e di", receiving great acclaim from the public. A year later, in 2012, she participated in Top Fest, with the song "Edhe pse gabim".

She graduated from the University of Arts for directing, in 2014. For her thesis, she directed the play True West (Perëndim i vërtetë) in the National Theatre of Albania, which resulted in success. She has acted in numerous theatre plays throughout the years, such as in Les Bonnes, A Streetcar Named Desire, What the Butler Saw, Hamlet and many more, making theatre her biggest artistic achievement.

In 2016, Laura Nezha participated in the Albanian version of the dancing competition "Dance With Me" where after 15 weeks of different dance numbers, she won the First Prize. In 2017 she voice acted in the Albanian-language version of Moana, where she voiced the titular character. After 6 years, she returned to Kënga Magjike in 2017, with the song "Je dashuri".

Discography
 2011: Jo s'e di
 2012: Edhe pse gabim
 2016: Luv That
 2017: Je dashuri

Theatre

Filmography

Film

Television

Awards
Gjeniu i vogël

|-
|rowspan="1"|2004
|rowspan="1"|"Herself"
| Third Prize
|
|}

RinFest

|-
|rowspan="1"|2007
|rowspan="1"|"Herself"
| First Prize
|
|}

Dance With Me Albania

|-
|rowspan="3"|2016
|rowspan="3"|"Laura & Renato"
| First Main Prize
|
|-
| 6th Night Prize
|
|-
| 12th Night Prize
|
|}

References

1990 births
Living people
People from Fier
21st-century Albanian women singers
Albanian stage actresses
Albanian film actresses
Albanian voice actresses
Albanian theatre directors
21st-century Albanian actresses